Elektrogosk is a railway station on Gorkovsky suburban railway line of Moscow Railway. This station is the terminus of Pavlovsky Posad - Elektrogorsk line. The station is located in Elektrogorsk, Moscow Oblast.

References

External links 

Elektrogorsk Station on the site Photolines (Railways.info)

Railway stations in Moscow Oblast
Railway stations of Moscow Railway
Railway stations in Russia opened in 1925